This is a list of all tornadoes that were confirmed by local offices of the National Weather Service in the United States from October to December 2014.

United States yearly total

October

October 2 event

October 3 event

October 6 event

October 7 event

October 9 event

October 10 event

October 13 event

October 14 event

October 15 event

October 23 event

November

November 16 event

November 17 event

November 23 event

December

December 12 event

December 14 event

December 15 event

December 23 event

December 24 event

December 27 event

December 29 event

See also
 Tornadoes of 2014

Notes

References

Tornadoes of 2014
2014, 10
October 2014 events in the United States
November 2014 events in the United States
December 2014 events in the United States